Nordine Assami (born 24 July 1987 in Marseille) is a retired French-Algerian professional football player and current manager of SC Air Bel's U16 team.

Club career
On 29 June 2011 Assami signed a two-year contract with Algerian Ligue Professionnelle 1 club JS Kabylie. He returned to France in the summer 2012, joining GS Consolat.

Coaching career
In the summer 2019, Assami became the manager of SC Air Bel's U16 team.

Honours
 Won the Coupe Gambardella once with RC Strasbourg in 2006

References

External links
 
 

1987 births
Algerian footballers
French footballers
French sportspeople of Algerian descent
Algerian Ligue Professionnelle 1 players
Czech First League players
Championnat National players
Championnat National 2 players
Championnat National 3 players
AS Cannes players
FC Istres players
Gap HAFC players
JS Kabylie players
1. FK Příbram players
Marignane Gignac Côte Bleue FC players
Athlético Marseille players
FC Martigues players
Living people
Footballers from Marseille
Association football defenders
Expatriate footballers in the Czech Republic
Aubagne FC players